Maria Soledad Onetto (born July 27, 1976 in Santiago, Chile) is a Chilean TV presenter.  She is a journalism graduate from the Pontifical Catholic University of Chile, news reader and TV host Chile. She is married to Rodrigo Alonso.

References

1976 births
Living people
People from Santiago
Chilean television journalists
Chilean women journalists
Chilean television presenters
Chilean people of Italian descent
Chilean people of Arbëreshë descent
Chilean women television presenters
Chilean television personalities